This is a list of mayors of the Bundaberg Region (2008–present) and City of Bundaberg in Queensland, Australia, and its predecessors.

Bundaberg was originally established as a Municipality on 22 April 1881, on land previously managed by the Barolin Divisional Board. With the passage of the Local Authorities Act 1902, Bundaberg became a Town on 31 March 1903, and on 22 November 1913, it was accorded City status.

Barolin Divisional Board
 E. B. Jeune (1880)

Municipality of Bundaberg
 Richard Ruddell (1881)
 Walter Adams (1882, 1883)
 Capt. William Edward Curtis (1884)
 Andrew M. Goodwin (1885)
 Michael Duffy (1886)
 Daniel McConville (1887)
 Michael Duffy (1888)
 John Rowland (1888, 1889)
 Andrew M. Goodwin (1890)
 James C. Walker (1891)
 John Rowland (1892)
 Capt. William Edward Curtis (1893)
 Daniel McConville (1894, 1895)
 John F. Boreham (1896)
 Patrick Duffy (1897)
 Andrew Dunne (1898)
 Robert Totten (1899)
 Frederick Colman (1900)
 Gustav Steindl (1901)
 Richard Ruddell (1902)

Town of Bundaberg 

 William F. Marshall (1903)
 John Wyper (1904)
 Robert McMannie (1905)
 Michael Duffy (1906) 
 Albert E. Avenell (1907)
 Richard Ruddell (1908)
 John Redmond (1909)
 Peter Neilson (1910)
 Alexander Stevenson (1911)
 Lewis Holden Maynard (1912)
 William Dunn (1913)

City of Bundaberg 

 William Dunn (1913)
 Rev. Father J. Mimnagh (1914)
 Elwyn Thomas Steptoe (1915, 1916)
 Richard Ruddell (1917)
 William Dunn (1918)
 Martin Dunn (1919)
 William Gavegan (1920–1923)
 Richard G. Curtis (1924) 
 William S. P. Gavegan (1925, 1926) (Nationalist)
 Bernard McLean (1927–1936) (Labor)
 Frederick Harold Buss (1936–1958)
 Clifford John Nielsen (1958–1984)
 Allan Stewart (1984–1988)
 Jeff Boreham (1988–1991)
 Nita Cunningham (1991–1998)
 Kay McDuff (1998–2008)

Bundaberg Region 
 Lorraine Pyefinch (2008–2013)
 Mal Forman (2013 - 2016)
 Jack Dempsey (2016 - present)

References

 

Bundaberg
Mayors Bundaberg